Provincial and territorial museums of Canada are museums maintained by the provinces and territories of Canada to preserve their local history and culture. However, the collections of some museums extend beyond its provincial boundaries, showcasing historical and natural works from around the world. These museums are the equivalent to national museums, operated by the provincial and territorial governments of Canada. In the mostly French-speaking province of Quebec, the provincial government uses the term "national" to refer to provincial museums.

Many provinces have separate facilities for human and natural history museums, art galleries, and archives. However, in the case of Newfoundland and Labrador, all these functions are housed in one complex, The Rooms, in St. John's.

List of provincial and territorial history museums 
Nearly all Canadian provinces and territories operate a provincial museum of some kind, the majority being either encyclopedic museums that cover a wider variety of topics including science and nature, or history museums, that focus on human events.  The only province that does not operate a provincial museum is Prince Edward Island. The following table lists the provincial and territorial museums presently operating in Canada.

List of provincial and territorial art galleries 
Several Canadian provinces and territories operate art galleries. The following table lists the provincial and territorial art galleries presently operating in Canada.

Although it receives public money, the Art Gallery of Alberta is not a provincially-operated institution, but is run by a not-for-profit society, and has been excluded from this table.

List of provincial and territorial archives and libraries 
Nearly all Canadian provinces operate a provincial archive and libraries. The British Columbia Archives was a former provincial agency that managed the archives for the province of British Columbia. In 2003, the provincial government merged the British Columbia Archives with the Royal British Columbia Museum, while the record management component of the former agency was assumed by the British Columbia Ministry of Labour and Citizens' Services. Since 2003, the Royal British Columbia Museum maintains the provincial archives as a department of the museum.

The following table lists the nine provincial archives and libraries presently operating in Canada.

List of other provincial and territorial museums 
Some provinces and territories operate additional museums that serve specialized topics.

See also
 List of museums in Canada
 National museums of Canada

Notes

References

Museums in Canada
Lists of museums in Canada